The word Eternity was a graffito tag recorded over an approximate 35-year period from 1932 to 1967, written numerous times in chalk in the streets of Sydney, Australia. The word had been written by Arthur Stace, an illiterate former soldier, petty criminal and alcoholic who became a devout Christian in the late 1940s.

Arthur Stace

For years after his conversion up until his death in 1967, Arthur Stace walked the streets of Sydney writing the single word "Eternity" on walls and footpaths in his unmistakable copperplate handwriting. His identity remained unknown until it was finally revealed in a newspaper article in 1956. It is estimated Stace wrote the word over half a million times.

Only two original Eternity inscriptions are known to exist. One is on a piece of cardboard Stace gave to a fellow parishioner, and is held by the National Museum of Australia in Canberra. The other, and the only remaining inscription in situ, is inside the bell of the Sydney General Post Office clock tower.

Legacy and cultural impact 
After Stace's death, the Eternity signature lived on. Australian contemporary artist, illustrator and filmmaker Martin Sharp noticed it and celebrated Stace's one-man campaign in many of his works. More recently, some Australian Christian groups, including those at universities, have run evangelistic campaigns whose promotion involved chalking "Eternity", after Stace's fashion, on footpaths.

As part of the fireworks on Sydney Harbour to mark New Year's Day of the year 2000, the graffito "Eternity" was illuminated on the Sydney Harbour Bridge. This moment was symbolically recreated later that year as part of the Sydney 2000 Olympics Opening Ceremony, beamed to billions of television viewers worldwide.

In 2001 the Council of the City of Sydney was granted a trademark (817532) on the script in order to protect it from indiscriminate commercial use.

Sydney based Australian non-denominational Publication Eternity founded in 2009 was named after the tag.

One of the works by English street artist Banksy during his October 2013 "residency" in New York City depicts a worker washing away the Eternity tag.

Sculptor, Will Coles, used the words on a concrete can.

References

External links
 Eternity: Stories from the emotional heart of Australia: The Eternity gallery at the National Museum of Australia
 Chalked Eternity sign by Arthur Stace at the National Museum of Australia
 Stace, Arthur Malcolm (1885–1967)- entry in the Australian Dictionary of Biography, National Centre of Biography, Australian National University
  [CC-By-SA]

History of Sydney
Australian fringe and underground culture
Graffiti and unauthorised signage